Noliproctis is a monotypic moth genus in the subfamily Lymantriinae described by Hering in 1926. Its only species, Noliproctis milupa, was first described by Nye in 1980. It is found on Madagascar.

References

Lymantriinae
Monotypic moth genera